These are the results for the 27th edition of the Ronde van Nederland cycling race, which was held from August 17 to August 22, 1987. The race started in Bergen op Zoom (North Brabant) and finished in Gulpen (Limburg).

Stages

17-08-1987: Bergen op Zoom-Bergen op Zoom (Prologue), 3.5 km

18-08-1987: Bergen op Zoom-Huizen, 218 km

19-08-1987: Huizen-Almelo, 207 km

20-08-1987: Almelo-Groningen, 190 km

21-08-1987: Apeldoorn-Nijmegen, 117 km

21-08-1987: Wijchen-Nijmegen (Team Time Trial), 14.3 km

22-08-1987: Maastricht-Gulpen, 197 km

Final classification

External links
Wielersite Results

Ronde van Nederland
August 1987 sports events in Europe
1987 in road cycling
1987 in Dutch sport